Odozana incarnata is a moth of the subfamily Arctiinae. It was described by Peter Jörgensen in 1935 and it is found in Paraguay.

References

Lithosiini
Moths described in 1935